The Wrong Ferarri is a feature-film written and directed by Adam Green. Conceived on Green's European music tour in the summer of 2010, the film was shot entirely on an iPhone camera, with Green writing the script for the actors on index cards. Scenes were shot in France, Prague, Venice, The Jersey Shore and New York City. Green has stated that The Wrong Ferarri was inspired by Woody Allen's Bananas, Alejandro Jodorowsky's The Holy Mountain, "Weird Al" Yankovic's UHF, Robert Downey, Sr.'s Putney Swope and the television show Seinfeld. The film contains strong profanity, sexual themes, and several scenes of nudity and is unrated by the MPAA.

The film's title was intentionally misspelled.

Premise
The plot follows four of Greenster's love affairs, life as a video game character and the use of the hallucinogen ketamine. The film is structured as a series of sketches with Dadaist dialogue, and does not follow a continuous plot.

Cast

 Adam Green as Greenster
 BP Fallon as Old Greenster
 Jack Dishel
 Chris Egan
 Jon Wiley
 Larissa Brown
 Cory Kennedy
 Dev Hynes
 Illyse Singer
 Macaulay Culkin
 Devendra Banhart
 The Shining Twins
 Isabelle McNally
 Pete Doherty
 Har Mar Superstar
 Omer Shemesh
 Steve Mertens
 Lindsay Hogan
 Alia Shawkat
 Aris Shwab
 Jeffrey Lewis
 Xan Aird
 Binki Shapiro
 Francesco Mandelli
 Danielle Johnson
 Sky Ferreira
 Matt Romano
 Leah Green
 Toby Goodshank
 Dashan Coram
 Julie LaMendola
 Johnny Dydo
 Aleksa Palladino
 Mick Whitnail
 Alexandra Costin
 Seth Faergolzia
 Tobias G. Rylander
 Parker Kindred
 Evan Dando (voicework)
 Donald Cumming (voicework)

Release
The Wrong Ferarri was first released online as a free download. On April 4, 2011, the film premiered at Anthology Film Archives in New York City.

References

External links

 
 

2011 films
Films about drugs
American independent films
2011 comedy-drama films
American comedy-drama films
2011 independent films
2010s English-language films
2010s American films